Marina Zgurscaia (21 June 1989, Chisnau) is a Moldovan female sport shooter. At the 2012 Summer Olympics, she competed in the Women's 10 metre air pistol, finishing in 29th place.

References

Moldovan female sport shooters
Living people
Olympic shooters of Moldova
Shooters at the 2012 Summer Olympics

1989 births
Sportspeople from Chișinău